Bauyrzhan Dzholchiyev (born 8 May 1990) is a Kazakh footballer who last played for FC Astana and Kazakhstan national football team, as a striker.

Early career
After joining FC Alma-Ata he started in senior team in 2008. However, he has spent most of his early professional career at FC Atyrau, having played for the Caspian team two and half seasons through 2009-2011 and winning first Kazakhstan Cup in club's history in 2009.

Tobol
In June 2011 in the middle of the season Baurzhan moved to FC Tobol, where he started at UEFA Champions League 2011-12. In the beginning of season 2012 he was awarded Player of Month twice in March & April. On 1 June 2012, Baurzhan made a debut for the senior Kazakhstan team against Kyrgyzstan.

Astana
In March 2014 Dzholchiyev signed for FC Astana. On 18 August, he scored the only goal as they defeated APOEL FC in the first leg of the UEFA Champions League playoff.

In December 2017, it was rumoured that Dzholchiyev would join FC Ordabasy in January 2018, two years after his last game.

Career statistics

Club

International

Statistics accurate as of match played 29 February 2012

International goals

Honours 
 Kazakhstan Premier League: 2014
 Kazakhstan Cup Winner: 2009
 Kazakhstan Cup Runner-up: 2011
 Player of Month by Sports.kz: March 2012, April 2012
 Kazakhstan Super Cup: 2015

References

1990 births
Living people
Association football forwards
Kazakhstani footballers
Kazakhstan under-21 international footballers
Kazakhstan international footballers
FC Tobol players
FC Astana players
FC Atyrau players
Kazakhstan Premier League players